The General Instruction of the Roman Missal (GIRM)—in the Latin original, Institutio Generalis Missalis Romani (IGMR)—is the detailed document governing the celebration of Mass of the Roman Rite in what since 1969 is its normal form. Originally published in 1969 as a separate document, it is printed at the start of editions of the Roman Missal since 1970.


Background 
The 1960 Code of Rubrics replaced the Rubricae Generales Missalis, which had been in the Tridentine Roman Missal since its first edition in 1570 and had been amplified and revised by Pope Clement VIII in 1604. This had been supplemented, since the 1920 edition, by the Additiones et Variationes in Rubricis Missalis ad normam Bullae "Divino afflatu" et subsequentium S.R.C. decretorum (Additions and Variations to the Rubrics of the Missal in accordance with the Bull Divino afflatu and subsequent decrees of the Sacred Congregation of Rites), which indicated the changes in the Roman Missal that followed from the reform of the Roman Breviary by Pope Pius X.

In his 1962 edition, Pope John XXIII had made some changes to the document at the beginning of the Roman Missal called Ritus servandus in celebratione Missarum ('Rite to be observed in celebration of Masses').

Status 
In his apostolic exhortation Sacramentum caritatis, Pope Benedict XVI stressed the importance of proper knowledge of the General Instruction not only for priests but also for the laity:

Regulations for masses not using the GIRM 
In the circumstances indicated in the motu proprio Traditionis Custodes of 2021, the Catholic Church still permits celebrations of Mass in accordance with the 1962 edition of the Roman Missal. Such celebrations are governed not by the General Instruction but by the 1960 Code of Rubrics, particularly its section Rubricae generales Missalis Romani (General Rubrics of the Roman Missal), and by the Ritus servandus in celebratione Missae (Rite to be observed in celebration of Mass).

Structure
The General Instruction is arranged in nine chapters, preceded by a preamble. The chapter headings are:
 The Importance and Dignity of the Eucharistic Celebration
 The Structure of the Mass, Its Elements and Its Parts
 The Duties and Ministries in the Mass
 The Different Forms of Celebrating Mass
 The Arrangement and Furnishing of Churches for the Celebration of the Eucharist
 The Requisites for the Celebration of Mass
 The Choice of the Mass and Its Parts
 Masses and Prayers for Various Circumstances and Masses for the Dead
 Adaptations within the Competence of Bishops and Bishops' Conferences

Versions
The Latin original may be consulted at a number of sites. The most easily legible on a computer screen is perhaps that of the Salesians of Don Bosco (German Salesians).

An English translation, but with adaptations for the United States, can be consulted at the appropriate web page of the United States Conference of Catholic Bishops' Committee on Divine Worship. The same translation, but with adaptations instead for England and Wales, may be found at the web site of the England & Wales Liturgy Office.

See also
Roman Missal
Mass of Paul VI

References

Further reading 

 A commentary on the general instruction of the Roman Missal: developed under the auspices of the Catholic Academy of Liturgy and cosponsored by the Federation of Diocesan Liturgical Commissions, Liturgical Press, 2007

External links
General Instruction of the Roman Missal in English on the Vatican website
GIRM for the United States on the United States Conference of Catholic Bishops website
GIRM for England and Wales on the Catholic Bishops’ Conference of England and Wales website
GIRM in Latin on the Salesians of Don Bosco website

Documents of the Congregation for Divine Worship and the Discipline of the Sacraments
1969 documents
1969 in Christianity
Catholic liturgical law